Cassandra is the 1997 debut instrumental album from the band Zoar.

Track listing
  Cassandra (Part 1) – 6:26  
  Cassandra (Part 2) – 3:35  
  Cassandra (Part 3) – 6:31  
  The Passing of a Plague – 4:19  
  Death by Denial – 7:14  
  Nine Days North – 6:21  
  Ligeia – 2:26  
  If Only You Knew – 5:29  
  An Early Disobedience – 4:56  
  A Handful of Poison – 10:26

References

External links 
 
 

Zoar (band) albums
1997 albums
Instrumental albums